Wasalandia Amusement Park was an amusement park in Vaasa, Finland. It opened in 1988 and closed after summer 2015. It offered up to 28 rides for the whole family. The park was owned by Puuharyhmä Oyj (formerly Tervakosken Puuhamaa Oy) until 2007. In its last years, Wasalandia was owned by the Spanish company Aspro Ocio, S.A.

Wasalandia was located on the island Vaskiluoto some 3 kilometres from downtown Vaasa. The indoor waterpark Tropiclandia located nearby continued its operations.

Trafficland

Pirateland

Jumping and Climbingland

Wild West

Funfairland

3D Movie theatre with moving seats was located in the Wild West section of the Wasalandia park. The park also featured two restaurants and kiosks, and a souvenir and snack shop.

References

External links

Defunct amusement parks in Finland
Water parks in Finland
Aspro Parks attractions
Finnish companies established in 1988
2015 disestablishments in Finland
Buildings and structures in Ostrobothnia (region)
Tourist attractions in Ostrobothnia (region)
Vaasa
Amusement parks opened in 1988
Amusement parks closed in 2015